Nağıoba (also, Nagyoba) is a village in the Khachmaz Rayon of Azerbaijan.  The village forms part of the municipality of Dədəli.

References 

Populated places in Khachmaz District